Marvinci (Macedonian and ) is a village in the Valandovo municipality, in the southeastern part of North Macedonia.

Geography
Marvinci is located in the southeast of the country, some 8 km from the nearest town, also the municipal seat, Valandovo. The village is located in the historical region of Bojmija, in the valley of the Vardar, near 70 m above sea level. The surroundings of the village is plain and fertile agricultural area.

The climate is humid continental, with notable influence of the Aegean (hot summers).

Population
According to the 2002 census, the village had a total of 504 inhabitants, out of which a majority declared as Serbs (56%), the rest as Macedonians (44%). The predominant religion of the population is Eastern Orthodoxy.

References

Villages in Valandovo Municipality
Serb communities in North Macedonia